Synthetic personalisation is the process of addressing mass audiences as though they were individuals through inclusive language usage. It developed from critical discourse analysis (CDA), a branch of sociolinguistics concentrating upon how power is articulated.

Norman Fairclough, credited with developing the concept, calls it "a compensatory tendency to give the impression of treating each of the people 'handled' en masse as an individual.  Examples would be air travel (have a nice day), [and] restaurants (welcome to Wimpy!)" (2001: 52).

The use of second person pronouns contributes significantly to the process of synthetic personalisation within the mass media.  It is extremely common to encounter constructions such as "See you after the break" on television shows prior to commercial breaks. (This example is also common in Paddy Scannell's concept of Broadcast Sociability.)

Mary Talbot ([1995]/2003) used the concept in her work on a synthetic sisterhood in teenage girls' magazines, analysing the linguistic devices (pronouns, presuppositions) constructing a simulated friendship between reader and producer. Using a variety of sociolinguistic concepts, including positive politeness, she comments upon the ideological implications, such as patriarchy.

References 

Fairclough, N. (2001) Language and Power. 2nd ed. Essex: Longman.
Talbot, M. (1995) "A synthetic sisterhood: false friends in a teenage magazine" In: K. Hall and M. Bucholtz (eds) Gender Articulated: Language and the Socially Constructed Self. New York: Routledge. pp. 143–65.
Talbot, M., K. Atkinson & D. Atkinson (2003) Language and Power in the Modern World. Edinburgh: Edinburgh University Press. 

Sociolinguistics